Zmaráy  is the name of the fifth month of the Afghan calendar. It occurs within the summer season (from July 22/23 to August 21/22) and contains 31 days.

Zmaray corresponds with the tropical Zodiac sign Leo. Zmaráy literally means "lion" in Pashto. It is also used as a given name.

Events 
 16 - 1298 - The Anglo-Afghan Treaty of 1919 is signed by the governments of Great Britain and Afghanistan, putting an end to the brief Third Anglo-Afghan War. 
 27 - 1298 - Afghanistan regains its independence from being a British protectorate.

Observances 

 Birthday of Simón Bolívar and Colombian and Venezuelan Navy Day - 2 Zmaray
 United States Coast Guard Day - 13 Zmaray
 National Day (Singapore) - 18 Zmaray
 Independence Day (Pakistan) - 22 or 23 Zmaray
 Assumption and Dormition of the Blessed Virgin Mary and Independence Day (India) - 23 or 24 Zmaray
 Independence Day (Indonesia) - 26 Zmaray
 National Aviation Day (United States) and Afghan Independence Day- 28 Zmaray

References

Pashto names for the months of the Solar Hijri calendar

ps:زمری(مياشت)